Electrocompaniet is a Norwegian manufacturer of high-end audio products. Their philosophy of the perfect sound has been controversial over their 40 years of history. They base their ideal sound not on technical measurements and theory but rather on getting a sound most true to the live listening experience. Their amplifiers have been used in several Recording Studios, including Michael Jackson and Abbey Road Studios.

History 
Electrocompaniet was established in 1973 by Per Abrahamsen and Svein Erik Børja. Their idea was to create a transistor amplifier that is better sounding than transistor amplifiers did at the time. They based their circuits on research done by Matti Otala of Tampere University of Technology. Their first finished product was a 25 Watt power amplifier named 
"The 2 Channel Audio Power Amplifier", It was also called "The Otala Amplifier". They continued development on the product. In 1976 a respected high end audio magazine at the time ¨The Audio Critic¨ reviewed the amplifier and wrote: “Audio freaks – eat your hearts out. This is the world’s best-sounding amplifier.” And in 1991
Michael Jackson's producer Bruce Swedien was contacted by Nils Bjarne Kvam one of the biggest producers in Norway at the time, and he told him about the amplifiers of Electrocompaniet, and Swedien started getting interested. The amplifier was packed and shipped to the US in September 1991. Bruce was busy at the time since he was working with the last mix to Jackson's Dangerous. He LOVED the amplifiers and wanted to use it on the album, but the album was almost done, and he would then have to remaster it all over again since the difference was so big. Swedien was ready to use the amplifiers on the next albums. He used it for the first time with Sergio Mendez, and when he walked in the recording studio with Jackson in January 1995 he really started using them. The next two albums History and Invincible was mastered with the amplifiers, and both albums thanked Electrocompaniet with '`Special thanks to Electrocompaniet¨ with logo on its covers.

In 2004 the company went bankrupt, but in 2007 the company was bought up by Norwegian company "Westcontrol". All production was moved to Tau, near Stavanger. Today they are represented in over 50 countries worldwide. In June 2018, Electrocompaniet filed for bankruptcy for the second time. The company was then acquired by a group of investors who resumed operations of the company.

Notable products

The 2 channel audio power amplifier 
The 2 channel audio power amplifier was the first amplifier Electrocompaniet produced. It was a 2x25 Watt Stereo power amplifier based on the works of Dr. Matti Otala on TIM-free transistor design. It has been updated and re-produced several times. Since it was only 2x25 Watt Electrocompaniet designed bigger amplifiers with more wattage but with the same sound characteristics.

NEMO AW 600 monaural class A reference amplifier
The AW600 NEMO monaural class A reference amplifier" by Electrocompaniet is used in listening and reference studios across the world. It is often coupled with the Bowers & Wilkins Nautilus reference, and the 800 Diamond series loudspeakers.

Electrocompaniet clearly made this amplifier to be a match with the Nautilus loudspeakers. At the time of realization for Nautilus there were few power amplifiers capable of delivering the power that they required. Electrocompaniet named their new mono amplifier after Nemo, the fictional captain of the Nautilus submarine from the Jules Verne Novel Twenty Thousand Leagues Under the Sea.

NEMO was at some point (and still might be) at use in Abbey Road Studios. The NEMO has collected rave reviews from among others Stereophile USA and Haute Fidelite France.

At 1×600 Watts in 8 ohms it is among the most powerful high-end amplifiers in existence, and should be able to run most Hi-Fi Speakers produced.

EMC 1 CD player
In 1998 Electrocompaniet produced CD player called the EMC 1. Since then Electrocompaniet has produced several updates of the EMC. The one that is currently in production(2020) is the EMC 1 MKV. The MKV features 24-bit upsampling, SACD, electromechanical cancellation system, fully balanced D/A converter, separate transformers and PCB¨s.

ECG 1 turntable
In late 2014 Electrocompaniet developed their first turntable ever after years of requests from customers and distributors.
The turntable uses a Jelco tonearm, and a custom made cartridge by pick-up manufacturer Soundsmith. The plinth is made of three layers, consisting of two layers acrylic, and one aluminum layer in the middle. This so-called '´sandwich'´ construction isolates the plinth from vibrations and resonance. To keep all noise to a minimum, the motor is completely isolated from the plinth so as little as possible disturbance from the motor will reach the pickup. It has a motor control that can play 33 1/3, 45 and 78 RPM records.

References
 http://www.electrocompaniet.com
 http://www.electrocompaniet.no
 http://www.stereophile.com/solidpoweramps/300electro/
 http://www.aftenbladet.no/kultur/Special-thanks-to-Electrocompaniet-2704675.html
 http://www.abrahamsenaudio.no/Swedien_abrahamsen.asp#en

Audio equipment manufacturers of Norway